Laxmipur is a ward in the Ghorahi Sub Metropolitan which is located in Dang District in Lumbini Province of south-western Nepal. At the time of the 1991 Nepal census it had a population of 9,075 persons residing in 1493 individual households.

References

External links
UN map of the municipalities of Dang Deokhuri District

Populated places in Dang District, Nepal